Nikolas Agrafiotis (born 25 April 2000) is a professional footballer who plays as a forward for Eredivisie club Excelsior. Born in the Netherlands, he has represented Serbia at youth level.

Club career

Early years
Agrafiotis played in the youth departments of FC Den Bosch and Vitesse. From 2016 to 2020 he also played for the second team of the latter, Jong Vitesse. On 26 November 2016, he made his debut in the third-tier Tweede Divisie for Jong Vitesse, in the 3–0 away loss to VV Katwijk. Jong Vitesse suffered relegation to the Derde Divisie Sunday after the 2016–17 season, after which they reached promotion again a season later and returned to the Tweede Divisie.

Dordrecht
In June 2020, Agrafiotis signed as a free agent for FC Dordrecht, where he signed a contract until mid-2022. He made his professional debut on 30 August 2020, in a 0–0 home draw against Go Ahead Eagles.

Excelsior
On 31 January 2022, Agrafiotis signed a one-and-a-half-year contract with Excelsior, with an option for an additional year. He made his debut for the club on 7 February in a 4–1 league loss to FC Eindhoven, coming off the bench for Reuven Niemeijer in the 75th minute. Mostly appearing as a substitute, he would make his first start for the team on 29 April in a league draw against VVV-Venlo, also providing an assist to the late equaliser by Marouan Azarkan. 

Agrafiotis would prove decisive in the playoffs for promotion after Excelsior qualified by finishing sixth in the league table. He scored his first goal for the club late in extra time of the first round second leg against Roda JC Kerkrade to secure a 4–2 win on aggregate. He scored again on 21 May in a 3–1 win over Heracles Almelo, as they suffered relegation from the Eredivisie for the first time in two decades, and Excelsior advanced to the playoff final. Excelsior would eventually win promotion to the Eredivisie after a penalty shoot-out against ADO Den Haag.

International career
Agrafiotis was born in the Netherlands to a Greek father and a Serbian mother. He is a youth international for Serbia.

Career statistics

References

2000 births
Living people
Sportspeople from 's-Hertogenbosch
Footballers from North Brabant
Serbian footballers
Serbia youth international footballers
Dutch footballers
Serbian people of Greek descent
Dutch people of Serbian descent
Dutch people of Greek descent
Association football forwards
FC Den Bosch players
SBV Vitesse players
FC Dordrecht players
Excelsior Rotterdam players
Eerste Divisie players
Tweede Divisie players
Derde Divisie players